Pulvinora is a small genus of saxicolous (rock-dwelling), crustose lichens in the family Lecanoraceae. It has two species. The genus was circumscribed in 2021 by Evgeny Davydov and Lidia Yakovchenko to contain two species formerly in the Lecanora pringlei species group. The type species of the genus, P.  stereothallina, occurs in the Altai Mountains (Russia), while P. pringlei is found in North America.

Description
Pulvinora species have asci similar to those found in genus Lecanora. Their apothecia are mycolecanorine, meaning they are lecanorine (and so have a thalline margin with an intact cortex), but without photobiont cells in the thalline exciple. The apothecia eventually become convex with an algal layer that is pushed below the hypothecium. The form of the thallus is pulvinate (resembling tiny cushions), with squamules (scales) at the tips of pale brownish, branched structures similar to pseudopodetia.

Species
 Pulvinora pringlei 
 Pulvinora stereothallina

References

Lecanoraceae
Lecanorales genera
Lichen genera
Taxa described in 2021